Tennis has been an event at the South American Games since the first edition in 1978. Until 1986 it was known as the Southern Cross Games.

Medalists

Men's singles

Men's doubles

Men's team

Women's singles

Women's doubles

Women's team

Mixed doubles

References

 
South American Games